Rutina Wesley (born December 21, 1978) is an American actress. She is best known for her roles as Tara Thornton on the HBO television series True Blood, and Nova Bordelon on OWN’s Queen Sugar.

Early life and education
Wesley was born and raised in Las Vegas, Nevada. Her father, Ivery Wheeler, is a professional tap dancer, and her mother, Cassandra Wesley, was a showgirl. She attended high school at the Las Vegas Academy of International Studies, Performing and Visual Arts. She studied dance at Simba Studios and the West Las Vegas Arts Center.

While at the Las Vegas Academy, Wesley missed some auditions for college training programs. She finally decided to attend the University of Evansville in Indiana.

After Wesley earned her Bachelor of Fine Arts in Theatre Performance in 2001, her grandmother suggested that she do a nursing course to have a practical fallback job, but Wesley insisted on pursuing her artistic education. She enrolled at the Juilliard School in 2001 and graduated in May 2005 (Group 34). Her studies included a summer spent at the Royal Academy of Dramatic Art in London.

Career

In December 2006, Wesley was featured in David Hare's Broadway play The Vertical Hour. In 2007, Wesley also appeared in The Public Theater production of In Darfur by playwright Winter Miller, co-starring Heather Raffo and Aaron Lohr, among others.

Wesley had a minor role in the 2005 film Hitch, which was edited out in the final cut. In 2007, she made her on-screen debut as the main character in the film How She Move, from British director Ian Iqbal Rashid. The character Raya Green, who enters a step-dancing competition to secure funds for her education, was inspired by Tony Manero, portrayed by John Travolta in Saturday Night Fever. Prior to the shooting of the film, Wesley underwent a five-week dance rehearsal period. Portraying a woman of Jamaican descent, she also took dialect coaching for the role.

Wesley auditioned for the role Tara Thornton in the HBO series True Blood in 2007 and secured the part after creator Alan Ball chose her because "[she] was the first person who showed [Tara's] vulnerable side".

In January 2015, it was announced that Wesley had been cast in a recurring role on the NBC drama series Hannibal. She portrayed Reba McClane, "a blind woman who enters into a relationship with Francis Dolarhyde (Richard Armitage), and helps soothe his murderous urges—at least at first." Wesley appeared as Liza Warner in the fourth season of Arrow.

In 2016, Wesley was cast as the lead character Nova Bordelon in the Oprah Winfrey Network drama series Queen Sugar, produced by Ava DuVernay and Oprah Winfrey.

In 2023, Wesley portrayed Maria in the HBO series The Last of Us.

Personal life
Wesley divides her time between Los Angeles and Astoria, Queens. In 2005, she married her former Juilliard classmate Jacob Fishel, an actor. After separating in July, Wesley filed for divorce on August 16, 2013, citing irreconcilable differences.

In November 2017, Wesley announced her partnership to Shonda, a chef from New Orleans. They later broke up in 2019.

Filmography

Film

Television

Awards and nominations

See also
 LGBT culture in New York City
 List of LGBT people from New York City

References

External links
 
 
 Rutina Wesley at MSN Movies
 

1978 births
Actresses from Las Vegas
Juilliard School alumni
Living people
University of Evansville alumni
21st-century American actresses
American voice actresses
American television actresses
African-American actresses
American film actresses
LGBT African Americans
LGBT people from Nevada
American LGBT actors
LGBT actresses
21st-century African-American women
20th-century African-American people
20th-century African-American women